Westfield is a remote village, located 3 miles southeast of Thurso,  in Caithness, Scottish Highlands and is in the Scottish council area of Highland.

Forss Water passes through Westfield.

References

Populated places in Caithness